The Swimming portion of the 4th FINA World Aquatics Championships swam late July-early August 1982 in Guayaquil, Ecuador. The competition featured 19 long course (50m) events:
freestyle - 100, 200, 400, 800 (female only) and 1500 (male only);
backstroke - 100 and 200;
breaststroke - 100 and 200;
butterfly - 100 and 200;
individual medley (IM) - 200 and 400; and
relays - 4x100 free, 4x200 free (male only) and 4x100 medley.

Results

Men

Legend: WR – World record; CR – Championship record

Women

Legend: WR – World record; CR – Championship record

Medal standings

References
HistoFINA Men
HistoFINA Women

1982 World Aquatics Championships
Swimming at the World Aquatics Championships
1982 in swimming